Jörg Freimuth (born 10 September 1961 in Rathenow, Bezirk Potsdam) is a retired East German high jumper.

He won the bronze medal for East Germany in the 1980 Summer Olympics held in Moscow, Soviet Union with a jump of 2.31 metres. He retired in 1982 and started working as an electrician.

Jörg is the twin brother of decathlete Uwe Freimuth and the uncle of decathlete Rico Freimuth.

References

1961 births
Living people
People from Rathenow
People from Bezirk Potsdam
East German male high jumpers
Sportspeople from Brandenburg
German twins
Twin sportspeople
Olympic athletes of East Germany
Athletes (track and field) at the 1980 Summer Olympics
Olympic bronze medalists for East Germany
Medalists at the 1980 Summer Olympics
Olympic bronze medalists in athletics (track and field)